The World Today was BBC World Service's early morning news and current affairs programme, which as of 2011 was broadcast from 3:00 to 8:30 (GMT) daily. It consisted of news bulletins on the hour and half hour, serious international interviews and in-depth reports of world news. The World Service considered it to be one of their most important strands, and it won a Sony Radio Academy Award in 2009. Both The World Today and its fellow news programme Network Africa ended in 2012, when they were replaced by a new programme entitled Newsday.

History
The World Today was launched on the BBC's World Service in 1999 as part of a shake-up of the news programming.  In June 2012 the programme moved to Broadcasting House in central London.

Presenters 
Due to the nature of The World Today many BBC personalities appeared on the programme.  Core presenters included:

 Ed Butler
 Fergus Nicoll
 Max Pearson
 George Arney
 Julian Keane
 Komla Dumor
 Tom Hagler
 Roger Hearing
 Pascale Harter
 Jackie Leonard
 Lawrence Pollard
 Mark Whitaker 
 Sunita Nahar
 Durdana Ansari

See also

 BBC World Service, the home of The World Today
 BBC News
 BBC World News, The BBC's International Television Station

References

External links

BBC World Service programmes
BBC news radio programmes
RNZ International